Bonchis munitalis is a species of snout moth in the genus Bonchis. It was described by Julius Lederer in 1863, and is known from Honduras, the Dominican Republic, Brazil and Venezuela. It is also found in the southern United States.

References

Chrysauginae
Moths described in 1863